Lee Seong-yong (born 1964) is a South Korean air force general. He served as Chief of Staff of the Air Force of the Republic of Korea Air Force from 23 September 2020 to 4 June 2021.

He stepped down after an air force master sergeant was arrested on charges of sexually harassing a female colleague. She committed suicide in May 2021.

References 

Living people
1964 births
Place of birth missing (living people)
Chiefs of Staff of the Air Force (South Korea)
Korea Air Force Academy alumni